The Last Hour may refer to:

 The Last Hour (1921 film), a German silent film
 The Last Hour (1923 film), an American crime film directed by Edward Sloman
 The Last Hour (1930 film), a British comedy crime film
 The Last Hour (1991 film), an American action film
 The Last Hour (2017 film), a Peruvian thriller drama film by Eduardo Mendoza de Echave
 The Last Hour (play), a 1928 play by the writer Charles Bennett
The Last Hour, an Indian web series

See also 
 Last Hour, a 2008 American crime drama film